Eremogone is a genus of flowering plants in the family Caryophyllaceae, native to western North America, northern Asia, eastern Europe and northeastern Africa. Attempts to resolve taxonomic relationships within the Caryophyllaceae have resulted in the enlargement of Eremogone with species from other genera.

Species
Currently accepted species include:

Eremogone aberrans (M.E.Jones) Ikonn.
Eremogone acerosa (Boiss.) Ikonn.
Eremogone acicularis (F.N.Williams) Ikonn.
Eremogone aculeata (S.Watson) Ikonn.
Eremogone acutisepala (Hausskn. ex F.N.Williams) Ikonn.
Eremogone aksayqingensis (L.H.Zhou) Rabeler & W.L.Wagner
Eremogone ali-gulii Koç & Hamzaoglu
Eremogone androsacea (Grubov) Ikonn.
Eremogone angustisepala (McNeill) Ikonn.
Eremogone armeniaca (Boiss.) Holub
Eremogone asiatica (Schischk.) Ikonn.
Eremogone baxoiensis (L.H.Zhou) Dillenb. & Kadereit
Eremogone biebersteinii (D.F.K.Schltdl.) Holub
Eremogone blepharophylla (Boiss.) Ikonn.
Eremogone brachypetala (Grossh.) Czerep.
Eremogone brevipetala (Tsui & L.H.Zhou) Sadeghian & Zarre
Eremogone bryophylla (Fernald) Pusalkar & D.K.Singh
Eremogone calcicola (Gilli) Ikonn.
Eremogone capillaris (Poir.) Fenzl
Eremogone caricifolia (Boiss.) Ikonn.
Eremogone cephalotes (M.Bieb.) Fenzl
Eremogone cliftonii Rabeler & R.L.Hartm.
Eremogone commagenae (Çeleb. & Favarger) Rabeler & W.L.Wagner
Eremogone congesta (Nutt. ex Torr. & A.Gray) Ikonn.
Eremogone cucubaloides (Sm.) Hohen.
Eremogone curvifolia (Majumdar) Pusalkar & D.K.Singh
Eremogone davisii (McNeill) Holub
Eremogone dianthoides (Sm.) Ikonn.
Eremogone drypidea (Boiss.) Ikonn.
Eremogone eastwoodiae (Rydb.) Ikonn.
Eremogone edgeworthiana (Majumdar) Pusalkar & D.K.Singh
Eremogone fendleri (A.Gray) Ikonn.
Eremogone ferganica (Schischk.) Ikonn.
Eremogone ferrisiae (Abrams) R.L.Hartm. & Rabeler
Eremogone ferruginea (Duthie ex F.N.Williams) Pusalkar & D.K.Singh
Eremogone festucoides (Benth.) Pusalkar & D.K.Singh
Eremogone formosa (Fisch. ex Ser.) Fenzl
Eremogone franklinii (Douglas ex Hook.) R.L.Hartm. & Rabeler
Eremogone gerzensis (L.H.Zhou) Rabeler & W.L.Wagner
Eremogone glaucescens (H.J.P.Winkl.) Ikonn.
Eremogone globuliflora (Rech.f.) Ikonn.
Eremogone graminea (C.A.Mey.) C.A.Mey.
Eremogone griffithii (Boiss.) Ikonn.
Eremogone grueningiana (Pax & K.Hoffm.) Rabeler & W.L.Wagner
Eremogone gypsophiloides (L.) Fenzl
Eremogone haitzeshanensis (Tsui ex L.H.Zhou) Rabeler & W.L.Wagner
Eremogone holostea (M.Bieb.) Rupr.
Eremogone hookeri (Nutt.) W.A.Weber
Eremogone ikonnikovii Knjaz.
Eremogone insignis (Litv.) Ikonn.
Eremogone isaurica (Boiss.) Ikonn.
Eremogone ischnophylla (F.N.Williams) Rabeler & W.L.Wagner
Eremogone jakutorum (A.P.Khokhr.) N.S.Pavlova
Eremogone juncea (M.Bieb.) Fenzl
Eremogone kansuensis (Maxim.) Dillenb. & Kadereit
Eremogone kingii (S.Watson) Ikonn.
Eremogone koelzii (Rech.f.) Ikonn.
Eremogone kumaonensis (Maxim.) Pusalkar & D.K.Singh
Eremogone lancangensis (L.H.Zhou) Rabeler & W.L.Wagner
Eremogone ledebouriana (Fenzl) Ikonn.
Eremogone loisiae N.H.Holmgren & P.K.Holmgren
Eremogone longifolia (M.Bieb.) Fenzl
Eremogone lychnidea (M.Bieb.) Rupr.
Eremogone macradenia (S.Watson) Ikonn.
Eremogone macrantha (Schischk.) Ikonn.
Eremogone meyeri (Fenzl) Ikonn.
Eremogone minuartioides Dillenb. & Kadereit
Eremogone mongholica (Schischk.) Ikonn.
Eremogone mukerjeeana (Majumdar) Rabeler & W.L.Wagner
Eremogone multiflora (Gilli) Ikonn.
Eremogone oosepala (Bordz.) Czerep.
Eremogone paulsenii (H.J.P.Winkl.) Ikonn.
Eremogone persica (Boiss.) Ikonn.
Eremogone picta (Sm.) Dillenb. & Kadereit
Eremogone polaris (Schischk.) Ikonn.
Eremogone polycnemifolia (Boiss.) Holub
Eremogone potaninii (Schischk.) Rabeler & W.L.Wagner
Eremogone procera (Spreng.) Rchb.
Eremogone przewalskii (Maxim.) Ikonn.
Eremogone pseudacantholimon (Bornm.) Holub
Eremogone pulvinata (Edgew.) Pusalkar & D.K.Singh
Eremogone pumicola (Coville & Leiberg) Ikonn.
Eremogone qinghaiensis (Tsui & L.H.Zhou) Rabeler & W.L.Wagner
Eremogone rigida (M.Bieb.) Fenzl
Eremogone roborowskii (Maxim.) Rabeler & W.L.Wagner
Eremogone saxatilis (L.) Ikonn.
Eremogone scariosa (Boiss.) Holub
Eremogone shannanensis (L.H.Zhou) Rabeler & W.L.Wagner
Eremogone sinaica (Boiss.) Dillenb. & Kadereit
Eremogone stenomeres (Eastw.) Ikonn.
Eremogone surculosa (Rech.f.) Ikonn.
Eremogone szowitsii (Boiss.) Ikonn.
Eremogone taibaishanensis (L.H.Zhou) Rabeler & W.L.Wagner
Eremogone talassica (Adylov) Czerep.
Eremogone tetrasticha (Boiss.) Ikonn.
Eremogone tschuktschorum (Regel) Ikonn.
Eremogone turlanica (Bajtenov) Czerep.
Eremogone ursina (Rob.) Ikonn.
Eremogone zadoiensis (L.H.Zhou) Rabeler & W.L.Wagner
Eremogone zargariana (Parsa) Holub

References

Caryophyllaceae
Caryophyllaceae genera